Mark Shepherd (born December 31, 1985), better known by his ring name Shane Taylor, is an American professional wrestler. He is best known for his stint in Ring of Honor (ROH), where he is former ROH World Six-Man Tag Team Champions with Shane Taylor Promotions teammates Moses and Kaun.  He is also a former ROH World Television Champion.

Background 
Shepherd grew up in the slums of Cleveland. His father was a drug dealer but did not want his son to follow on the same path and advised him to go to school. Shepherd studied business management, graduating in 2009. He also practiced boxing for 20 years and played American football during his university years. He is now married and has children.

Career

Ring of Honor (2014-2021)

Debut and Pretty Boy Killers (2014-2017) 
Shepherd made his first match in ROH on November 15, 2014, during a dark match at Glory By Honor XIII under the name Shane Taylor, where he lost to J. Diesel. During 2015, he made a few tag team matches with Keith Lee, most of which were not televised, and made themselves known under the name of "Pretty Boy Killers".

On August 27, 2016, during Field of Honor, they participated in a gauntlet tag team match in order to have an opportunity for the ROH World Tag Team Championship, but this match was won by The Addiction. At All Star Extravaganza VIII, they received another chance to have a championship match for these belts alongside The All Night Express, War Machine and the team of Colt Cabana and Dalton Castle, but Lee and Taylor lost the match. In early January, Taylor signed his first contract with the Ring of Honor. On February 3, 2017, they faced The Briscoe Brothers, where the match ended in a no contest. The team was then disbanded following the departure of Keith Lee from ROH.

Champion pursuits and Television Champion (2017-2021) 
Taylor then joined the team of The Rebellion, which also included Rhett Titus, Kenny King and Caprice Coleman. However, this team was dissolved a few months later, during Best in the World after they lost to Search and Destroy. On the third day of Global Wars, on October 14, he defeated Josh Woods. On October 20, he defeated Cheeseburger and received a shot for the ROH World Television Championship.

During the year 2018, Taylor lost several matches to become a challenger in the World Television Championship as well as the ROH World Six-Man Tag Team Championship on June 2 by partnering with The Dawgs. On October 12, at Glory by Honor XVI, he lost to Hangman Page. At the end of December, he signed an exclusive contract with ROH.

On May 9, at War of the Worlds, he defeated Jeff Cobb, as well as Brody King and Hirooki Goto and became ROH World Television Champion. On June 28, he defeated Bandido at Best in the World 2019 and retained his title. On September, ROH announced, as part of a storyline where he criticized the promotion’s lack of interest on his booking, they ended Taylor's contract with the promotion. At Death Before Dishonor XVII on September 27, he retained his title by beating Dragon Lee, Tracy Williams and Flip Gordon. After several successful title defenses during the federation tour in England during the month of October, he finally lost his belt to Dragon Lee at Final Battle on December 13.

In 2020, ROH would go on hiatus for most of the spring and summer due to the COVID-19 pandemic.  After ROH resumed operations, Taylor returned and defeated Jay Briscoe at Final Battle.  Then on the February 20, 2021 broadcast of Ring of Honor Wrestling, Taylor, Kaun and Moses would defeat MexiSquad (Bandido, Flamita, and Rey Horus) to win the ROH World Six-Man Tag Team Championship.

IMPACT Wrestling (2022) 
Taylor made his Impact debut on September 8, during Before the Impact in a loss against Crazzy Steve.

Championships and accomplishments 
 Cleveland Knights Championship Wrestling
 CKCW World Heavyweight Championship (1 time)
 New Era Pro Wrestling
 NEPW Triple Crown Championship (1 time)
Pro Wrestling Rampage
PWR Heavyweight Championship (1 time)
 PWR Lake Erie Championship (1 time)
 PWR Tag Team Championship (2 times) - with Bill Collier (1) and J-Rocc (1)
 Ring of Honor
 ROH World Six-Man Tag Team Championship (1 time) - with Kaun and Moses
 ROH World Television Championship (1 time)
 Reality Of Wrestling
 ROW Tag Team Championship (1 time) - with Tyree Taylor
 Renegade Wrestling Alliance
 RWA Heavyweight Championship (1 time)
 VIP Wrestling
 VIP Heavyweight Championship (2 times)
 VIP Tag Team Championship (1 time) - with Keith Lee
 WildKat Pro Wrestling
 WildKat Heavyweight Championship (2 times)
WildKat Heavyweight Championship Tournament (2015)
Pro Wrestling Illustrated
 Ranked No. 65 of the top 500 singles wrestlers in the PWI 500 in 2020

References

External links 
 

1986 births
Living people
American male professional wrestlers
African-American male professional wrestlers
Sportspeople from Cleveland
Professional wrestlers from Ohio
ROH World Television Champions
21st-century African-American sportspeople
20th-century African-American people
ROH World Six-Man Tag Team Champions